Lacona is a village in Tuscany, central Italy, administratively a frazione of the comune of Capoliveri, province of Livorno. At the time of the 2011 census its population was 303.

Lacona is located on the Elba Island and it is about 10 km from Capoliveri.

Bibliography 
 

Frazioni of the Province of Livorno